In quantum information and quantum computation, an entanglement monotone is a function that quantifies the amount of entanglement present in a quantum state. Any entanglement monotone is a nonnegative function whose value does not increase under local operations and classical communication.

Definition 
Let be the space of all states, i.e., Hermitian positive semi-definite operators with trace one, over the bipartite Hilbert space . An entanglement measure is a function such that:

  if  is separable;
 Monotonically decreasing under LOCC, viz., for the Kraus operator  corresponding to the LOCC , let  and for a given state , then (i)  does not increase under the average over all outcomes,  and (ii)  does not increase if the outcomes are all discarded, .

Some authors also add the condition that  over the maximally entangled state . If the nonnegative function only satisfies condition 2 of the above, then it is called an entanglement monotone.

References 

Quantum information theory